The 2007–08 Serie A (known as the Serie A TIM for sponsorship reasons) was the 106th season of top-tier Italian football, the 76th in a round-robin tournament. It started on 25 August 2007 and ended on 18 May 2008. Internazionale successfully defended the championship on the final day of the season, finishing first with 85 points, three ahead of Roma.

Events

Plusvalenze investigation
Inquiries are being conducted by the CO.VI.SOC. (Italian football's financial watchdogs) into the finances of four Serie A clubs (Internazionale, Milan, Sampdoria, and Reggina) who stand accused of falsely inflating player values — a practice known as plusvalenze in Italian — in order to qualify financially for the 2005–06 Serie A. If the allegations prove true, penalties could range from fines to point deductions, relegation to Serie B, and even the stripping of Internazionale's 2005-06 scudetto, which was stripped from Juventus as a result of the Calciopoli scandal before being awarded to Internazionale.

Lazio fan killed by police

On the morning of 11 November 2007 26-year-old Lazio fan Gabriele Sandri, a DJ from Rome, was killed by a shot in his neck while sitting inside a car, by a policeman, after some other fans of Lazio violently assaulted a group of Juventus ultras with stones on the A1 Motorway service station of Badia al Pino in Arezzo. Early reports suggested that a stray bullet from a gun, set to distract the group of ultras, hit the Lazio fan in the neck as he sat in a car and killed him. An emergency meeting set up between Lega Calcio president Antonio Matarrese and police chief Antonio Manganelli decided that the game between Inter and Lazio would be called off, but the rest of the fixtures would go ahead that day, starting at a slightly later time (about 10 minutes later). The Atalanta–Milan game was eventually suspended following unrest caused by local ultras attempting to break off the protection glass in order to invade the pitch and stop the match. Later in the afternoon, the Italian Football Federation chose to postpone also the game between AS Roma and Cagliari, whose kick off was scheduled for 8:30 pm at Stadio Olimpico, Rome. However, this did not prevent violent riots, as hundreds of armed hooligans attacked a police barracks and the CONI (Italian Olympic National Committee) headquarters in Rome.

Though Sandri's death was later held by some to have been caused by a tragic error by a policeman who claimed his gun went off as he was running. Prosecutors then opted initially to open an inquiry into manslaughter against the policeman, nevertheless the initial hearing held that Sandri's death was culpable homicide, and the policeman involved (Luigi Spaccarotella) was condemned to 6 years imprisonment. On appeal, the higher court not only confirmed this judgment, but increased the punishment to 9 years and 4 months as an element of intentionality was found.

Final week
The championship was decided in the final week, as Inter, who managed to secure even an 11-point advantage to rivals Roma in mid-season, lost almost all of it in the final weeks, maintaining only a one-point advantage with only one match to play. In the final week, both Inter and Roma were scheduled to play away matches opposed to relegation-battling sides, respectively Parma and Catania. Both matches were successively forbidden to be attended by Inter and Roma fans. In the end, Inter secured the scudetto with a 2–0 win, with both goals being scored in the second half by Zlatan Ibrahimović, who recovered from a long-time injury in time to play the game, whereas Roma only managed to achieve a 1–1 draw at Stadio Angelo Massimino against Walter Zenga's Catania, a result which allowed the Sicilian side to escape relegation at the expense of Empoli and Parma.

2007–08 teams

Stadiums and locations

Personnels and Sponsoring

League table

Results

Top goalscorers

Coaches

2007–08 events
Atalanta: on June 9, 2007 Luigi Delneri was announced as new head coach following Stefano Colantuono's departure to Palermo.
Cagliari: on November 13 Cagliari chairman Massimo Cellino sacked Marco Giampaolo and replaced him with veteran coach Nedo Sonetti, who already served twice with the rossoblu before this new appointment. On December 19 Sonetti tendered his resignation, after he managed to achieve only one point in three matches in charge, and Cellino called Giampaolo to serve again as rossoblu head coach. However, Giampaolo, still linked to Cagliari by a contract, turned down the opportunity to return. The next day, the club announced that it had rejected Sonetti's resignation. Sonetti was ultimately sacked only a few days later, on December 27, following a crushing 5–1 loss to Fiorentina, and replaced by Davide Ballardini, who served as Cagliari head coach in the early weeks of the 2005–06 season.
Catania: on June 3, 2007 Silvio Baldini was announced as new head coach. The team initially enjoyed a good shape, notably gaining a spot in the Coppa Italia semi-finals, but lost position with time, being in 16th place as of Week 31, only three points ahead of last-placed Empoli, convincing Baldini to leave the club with mutual consent on March 31, 2008. He was replaced the next day by Walter Zenga, former head coach of Red Star Belgrade and Steaua București, at his first coaching experience with a Serie A team.
Empoli: on November 26, 2007 the Tuscan side chose to sack Luigi Cagni, who achieved only ten points in fourteen matches (18th place in the league table) and failed to win the 2007–08 UEFA Cup first round, replacing him with Alberto Malesani. On March 31, 2008, after a 2–0 home loss to Sampdoria which left Empoli alone in last place, the board decided to sack Malesani, reinstalling Cagni in charge.
Juventus: on June 4, 2007 former Parma head coach Claudio Ranieri was unveiled as new boss.
Livorno: on October 9, 2007 Fernando Orsi was sacked following a string of poor results that brought the team down to bottom place in the league with two points and no win after seven games. The position was then filled by Giancarlo Camolese the next day. Camolese initially managed to improve Livorno's performances; however in the final part of the season Livorno entered into a deep result crisis that led them down to the league bottom, with three matches remaining, and Camolese being ultimately sacked on April 28, 2008, with Orsi re-appointed back at the helm of the amaranto.
Palermo: on June 7, 2007 Stefano Colantuono of Atalanta was announced to be the next rosanero boss for the 2007-08 season. However, on November 26 Colantuono was sacked following a 5–0 defeat to Juventus, and club chairman Maurizio Zamparini appointed Francesco Guidolin as his replacement, inaugurating a fourth spell with Palermo for the tactician. However, results did not improve under Guidolin, and three consecutive losses, followed by some controversial post-match comments in a 2–3 home loss to Genoa on March 22, 2008 led Zamparini to re-appoint Colantuono at the helm of the rosanero on March 24.
Parma: on June 12, 2007 Domenico Di Carlo was announced as new boss following the departure of Claudio Ranieri. However, as Parma struggled to keep themselves off the relegation battle, Di Carlo was sacked on March 10, 2008 following a 1–2 home defeat to Sampdoria. The next day the club announced to have appointed Héctor Cúper as new head coach. The Argentine boss did not manage to improve results, with Parma finding themselves in 18th place with only one remaining match to be played at home against first-placed Internazionale, only two points behind the last Serie A spot. On May 12 Parma chairman Tommaso Ghirardi then surprisingly announced to have sacked Cúper, replacing him with youth team coach Andrea Manzo for the final league matchday in a desperate attempt to escape relegation.
Reggina: on June 23, 2007 news reports announced Massimo Ficcadenti as new boss following the departure of Walter Mazzarri. However, on June 27 Verona announced they were not giving Ficcadenti permission to leave the club and move to Reggina. On July 1, Reggina finally announced on their website to have appointed Ficcadenti as coach, after he successfully rescinded his contract with Verona. Ficcadenti was however sacked on November 1, following a 3–1 home loss to last-placed Livorno and no wins in the first ten league days, and veteran coach Renzo Ulivieri was appointed to replace him. However, on March 3, 2008 the club management decided to dismiss Ulivieri from his post following a 0–0 home draw to Palermo, as Reggina was filling the 19th place with 22 points, and replaced him with team scout and former youth team coach Nevio Orlandi.
Sampdoria: on May 31, 2007 Walter Mazzarri was named new Samp boss.
Siena: on June 12, 2007 Andrea Mandorlini was confirmed new head coach following separation by mutual consent between the club and its boss Mario Beretta. However Mandorlini was sacked on November 12, after a 2–3 home loss to Livorno which left the team in last place, and Beretta accepted to return at Siena.
Torino: on June 6, 2007 former Sampdoria boss Walter Novellino was announced head coach for the new season, replacing Gianni De Biasi. On April 16, 2008, following a string of disappointing results that left the granata only four points ahead the relegation zone, leading to heavy criticisms from the supporting fanbase, Torino president Urbano Cairo chose to sack Novellino and reappoint De Biasi, a fan favourite, as head coach.
Udinese: on June 5, 2007 former Catania boss Pasquale Marino was officially unveiled as new head coach.

Number of teams by region

Footnotes

Serie A seasons
Italy
1